Peter H. Clark Montessori Junior High and High School, usually referred to as Clark Montessori, is a junior and senior high school in Cincinnati, Ohio, United States. The school had around 700 students in January 2018. It is in the Hyde Park–area woods, on the former estate of Ohio Governor Myers Y. Cooper (1929–1931), with trails in its "backyard". Recently completed in these woods is a small, ancient-Greek–style amphitheatre. The school had been located in its temporary home in Winton Terrace from the 2007/2008 school year until the 2011/2012 School  year. However, Clark has been back into its permanent home on Erie Avenue, since 2012.

Clark is a part of the Cincinnati Public Schools. Founded in 1994 as a seventh-grade extension of existing district Montessori elementary schools, Clark expanded with its first class to become a full junior and senior high school by the 1999–2000 school year, making it the first public Montessori high school in the United States. Although it has no entrance exam, 99.5% of Clark seniors have graduated and 96.5% of graduates attended post-secondary education. Additionally, Clark is racially and socio-economically diverse—30-51% of students are in their family’s first generation to attend college, and 33% receive free or subsidised lunch.
 
Each student must complete over 200 community service hours in order to receive a Clark diploma. These hours may be completed with any government recognized non-profit organization and previous stewardship projects include working with the Ohio State School for the Blind and Habitat for Humanity. Four years of core classes at the honors level are required. An important aspect that outlines Clark Montessori’s curriculum is senior project. In order to graduate, each senior is required to complete a year-long research project based on a question of their choice. This project entails a research paper, a physical product based on the students’ papers, and a detailed presentation and speech prepared for “senior project night” at the end of the year. In the four years of high school, students participate in eight two-week field studies referred to as intersessions.
 
The school has been given a rating of "effective" by Cincinnati Public Schools, but has been given many higher honors by education magazines and was in the top three school selected in Barack Obama's 2010 Race to the Top.

References

External links

Greatschools.net profile
https://eric.ed.gov/?q=clark+montessori&id=EJ1183086

Cincinnati Public Schools
Montessori schools in the United States
Educational institutions established in 1994
High schools in Hamilton County, Ohio
Public high schools in Ohio
Public middle schools in Ohio
1994 establishments in Ohio